The 2017–18 Scottish League Cup  (also known as the Betfred Cup for sponsorship reasons) was the 72nd season of Scotland's second-most prestigious football knockout competition.

The format for the 2017–18 competition remained the same as that which was introduced in the previous season's competition. 

It began with eight groups of five teams which included all Scottish Professional Football League (SPFL) clubs, excluding those competing in Champions League and Europa League qualifiers, as well as the winners of the 2016–17 Highland Football League (Buckie Thistle) and the 2016–17 Lowland Football League (East Kilbride).

The competition was won by Celtic, who beat Motherwell 2–0 in the final on 26 November 2017.

Schedule

Format
The competition began with eight groups of five teams. The four clubs competing in the UEFA Champions League (Celtic) and Europa League (Aberdeen, Rangers and St Johnstone) qualifying rounds were given a bye through to the second round. The 40 teams competing in the group stage consisted of the other eight teams that competed in the 2016–17 Scottish Premiership, and all of the teams that competed in the 2016–17 Scottish Championship, 2016–17 Scottish League One and 2016–17 Scottish League Two, as well as the 2016–17 Highland Football League and the 2016–17 Lowland Football League champions.

The winners of each of the eight groups, as well as the four best runners-up progressed to the second round (last 16), which included the four UEFA qualifying clubs. At this stage, the competition reverted to the traditional knock-out format. The four group winners with the highest points total and the clubs entering at this stage were seeded, with the four group winners with the lowest points unseeded along with the four best runners-up.

Bonus point system
In December 2015, the SPFL announced that alongside the new group stage format, a bonus point system would be introduced to provide greater excitement and increase the number of meaningful games at this stage. The traditional point system of awarding three points for a win and one point for a draw was used, however, for each group stage match that finished in a draw, a penalty shoot-out took place, with the winner being awarded a bonus point.

Group stage

The group stage was made up of eight teams from the 2016–17 Scottish Premiership, and all ten teams from each of the 2016–17 Scottish Championship, 2016–17 Scottish League One and 2016–17 Scottish League Two, as well as the winners of the 2016–17 Highland Football League and 2016–17 Lowland Football League. The 40 teams were divided into two sections: North and South; with each section containing four top seeded teams, four second seeded teams and 12 unseeded teams. Each section was drawn into four groups with each group being made up of one top seed, one second seed and three unseeded sides. Seedings for the draw were confirmed on 31 May 2017, two days before the draw.

The draw for the group stages took place on Friday 2 June 2017 at 6:30pm BST at the BT Sport Studio in London and was shown live on BT Sport 2.

North section

Group A

Group B

Group C

Group D

South section

Group E

Group F

Group G

Group H

Best runners-up

Knockout phase

Second round

Draw and seeding
The following teams qualified and competed in the second round of the 2017–18 Scottish League Cup. Aberdeen, Celtic, Rangers and St Johnstone entered the competition at this stage, after receiving a bye for the group stage due to their participation in UEFA club competitions.

The draw for the second round took place at Dens Park following the conclusion of the Dundee derby on 30 July, and was shown live on BT Sport's Facebook page & BT Sport 1. The four UEFA-qualifying clubs and the four group winners with the best record were seeded for the draw.

Teams in Bold advanced to the quarter-finals.

Notes
† denotes teams playing in the Championship.
* denotes team playing in League One.

Matches
All times are BST (UTC+1).

Quarter-finals

Draw
The quarter-final draw took place at Dens Park following the conclusion of the Dundee–Dundee United match on 9 August, and was shown live on BT Sport 1 & the BT Sport Facebook page. The draw was unseeded and ties were scheduled for the midweek of 19-21 September.

Teams in Bold advanced to the semi-finals.

Matches

Semi-finals

Draw
The semi-final draw took place at Fir Park following the conclusion of the Motherwell–Aberdeen match on 21 September, and was shown live on BT Sport 1. The draw was unseeded and ties were scheduled for the weekend of 21/22 October.

Teams in Bold progressed to the final.

Matches

Final

Top goalscorers

There were 324 goals scored in 95 matches in the competition, for an average of  goals per match.

Media coverage
The domestic broadcasting rights for the competition were held exclusively by BT Sport. Prior to the re-format in the 2015–16 season, BBC Scotland had exclusive rights.

The following matches were broadcast live on UK television:

References

External links
 

Scottish League Cup seasons
League Cup
2017–18 in Scottish football cups